Curtin may refer to:

Places
Curtin, Australian Capital Territory
Curtin, Oregon, U.S.
Curtin Township, Centre County, Pennsylvania, U.S.
Curtin, Nicholas County, West Virginia, U.S.
Curtin, Webster County, West Virginia, U.S.
RAAF Base Curtin, Derby, Western Australia
Division of Curtin, an Australian electoral division in Western Australia

Other uses
Curtin (surname), a surname common in Ireland
Curtin (2007 film), about Australian Prime Minister John Curtin
Curtin FM, a radio station based in Perth, Western Australia
Curtin University, in Western Australia
Curtin College

See also

Curtain (disambiguation)